This is a list of the National Register of Historic Places listings in Olmsted County, Minnesota.  It is intended to be a complete list of the properties and districts on the National Register of Historic Places in Olmsted County, Minnesota, United States.  The locations of National Register properties and districts for which the latitude and longitude coordinates are included below, may be seen in an online map.

There are 25 properties and districts listed on the National Register in the county, including one National Historic Landmark.  A supplementary list includes five additional sites that were formerly on the National Register.  Many of the county's listings are associated with the Mayo Clinic, an influential hospital and medical research facility founded in 1889.

Current listings

|}

Former listings

|}

See also
 List of National Historic Landmarks in Minnesota
 National Register of Historic Places listings in Minnesota

References

External links

 Minnesota National Register Properties Database—Minnesota Historical Society

Olmsted County